R. B. Gurudev is an Indian cinematographer, who has worked in the Tamil film industry.

Career
After apprenticing under Jeeva, Gurudev made his debut with Yogi (2009), though TN 07 AL 4777 (2009) released earlier. Gurudev's work has often won acclaim, the films he has worked on have often evaded commercial success. For his work in Chikku Bukku (2010), a critic from The Hindu noted that Gurudev "proves that he is from the late Jeeva's school, panning his camera in style he offers a brilliant visual treat". Likewise in Ameer's Aadhi Bhagavan, a critic wrote "whether it is the beaches of Pattaya, the deserts of Rajasthan, scenic Goa or Mumbai, cinematography by K. Devaraj and R. B. Gurudev is an absolute treat to the eye", and "each and every scene has been picturised tastefully". Similarly, his work in Megha (2014), was described as one of the film's few "bright spots".

Gurudev was involved in the making of the successful Kanchana 2 (2015) and completed eighty percent of the film's shoot. However a delay in the film meant that he was unable to continue shooting as he had committed to work on Irumbu Kuthirai (2014). Unwilling to wait, Raghava Lawrence decided to finish Kanchana 2 with another cinematographer, much to the annoyance of Gurudev.

Filmography
Urchagam (2007)
 Rameswaram (2008)
 TN 07 AL 4777 (2009)
 Yogi (2009)
 Chikku Bukku (2010)
 Aadhi Bhagavan (2013)
 Vathikuchi (2013)
 Megha (2014)
 Irumbu Kuthirai (2014)
 Kanchana 2 (2015)
 144 (2015)
 Mohini (2018)
 Kalari (2018)
 Genius (2018)
 Kennedy Club (2019)
 Gorilla (2019)
 Astakarmma (2022)
 Yutha Satham (2022)

References

External links
 

Living people
Artists from Chennai
Cinematographers from Tamil Nadu
Tamil film cinematographers
Year of birth missing (living people)